Ewa Edyta Kołodziej (born 1978) is a Polish politician. She holds a seat in the Sejm after being elected in 2011. In 2015 she was not elected, but was appointed to replace Tomasz Tomczykiewicz. In 2019 she was reelected.

References

1978 births
Living people
Members of the Polish Sejm 2011–2015
Members of the Polish Sejm 2015–2019
Members of the Polish Sejm 2019–2023